Universidad de Las Palmas de Gran Canaria Club de Fútbol was a Spanish football team based in Las Palmas de Gran Canaria, in the Canary Islands. Founded in 1994 as Vegueta-Universidad, it was dissolved in 2011 due to insurmountable economic problems.

It acted as the club of University of Las Palmas de Gran Canaria.

History
Universidad was founded in 1994, following interactions between lawyers and college students. It first began playing amateur football, under the name Vegueta-Universidad, only appearing in Tercera División in 1997–98.

After two promotions in only two years, the club played in the second level in 2000–01, being relegated immediately. During the campaign, Universidad played at Maspalomas, as its grounds were only artificial then, and neighbours UD Las Palmas did not wish to share its Estadio Insular.

Subsequently, Universidad played as feeder club to Unión Deportiva, after one of its founders and then chairman, Alfredo Morales, decided to merge after being installed into the latter's board of directors. It only lasted one season, as Francisco Gómez Cáceres returned (after being ousted by Morales) and rendered the club again independent, as it subsequently competed solely in the third division; in 2007, the club moved from the 2,000-seat Estadio Alfonso Silva to the Estadio Pepe Gonçalvez.

At the end of the 2010–11 season, Universidad was relegated to the fourth level for failing to pay its players. On 7 July 2011, the club was dissolved due to its enormous debts.

Season to season

1 season in Segunda División
12 seasons in Segunda División B
1 season in Tercera División

Former players

See also
Universidad de Las Palmas CF B, reserve team.

References

External links
Official website 
BDFútbol profile

 
Sport in Las Palmas
Association football clubs established in 1994
Association football clubs disestablished in 2011
Defunct football clubs in the Canary Islands
1994 establishments in Spain
2011 disestablishments in Spain
University and college association football clubs in Spain
Segunda División clubs